Lelo Saracens (or formally Rugby Club Lelo Tbilisi) is a Georgian semi-professional rugby union club from Tbilisi, who plays in the Georgia Championship, the first division of Georgian rugby. The team was Champion in 2004, 2009 and 2013. In July 2014, they became part of the Saracens global network, the ninth club to do so.

Achievements 

Didi 10:
Winners (4): 2004, 2009, 2015, 2016
Runner-up (5): 2007, 2008, 2010, 2013, 2014
Georgia Cup:
Winners (3): 2008, 2009, 2010

Current squad 
2020/2021 squad

Notable former players 
  Viktor Kolelishvili
  Mamuka Gorgodze
  Lasha Khmaladze
  Irakli Kiasashvili
  Luka Japaridze

See also

See also
:Category:Lelo Saracens players
 Rugby union in Georgia

References

Lelo
Sport in Tbilisi
Saracens Global Network
1969 establishments in the Soviet Union
Rugby clubs established in 1969